Kalamangi, also spelled as Kalamangi is a village near Turvihal in the Sindhanur taluk of Raichur district, in the Indian state of Karnataka. Kalmangi lies on the road connecting Sindhanur-Kushtagi.

Demographics
 census, Kalmangi had a population of 2,478 with 1,222 males and 1,256 females, and 429 households.

See also
Pura, Kushtagi
Tavaragera
Kanakagiri
Navali gangavathi
Sindhanur
Raichur

References

Villages in Raichur district